Protambulyx carteri, or Carter's sphinx, is a species of moth of the family Sphingidae. It is known from the US state of Florida.

References

External links
"Carter's sphinx (Protambulyx carteri)". Moths of America. Archived April 5, 2005.

Protambulyx
Moths described in 1903